William James Aylward (September 5, 1875 – February 26, 1956) was a war artist for the United States Army during World War I.

Biography
Aylward was born September 5, 1875, in Milwaukee, Wisconsin and developed an early interest in things nautical because his father built and owned Great Lakes ships. Much of the work from his early career reflects that influence. He studied art at the Art Institute of Chicago, at the Art Students' League in New York City, and with several artists in Europe. Like some of the other future official World War I combat artists, he studied with the famous illustrator and teacher, Howard Pyle.

Aylward began his professional career by writing and illustrating 18th century marine history for magazines such as Harper's and Scribner's. His artwork also appeared in illustrated editions of Jules Verne's Twenty Thousand Leagues Under the Sea and Jack London's The Sea-Wolf. He combined his interest in the sea and his abilities as an illustrator to produce advertisements featuring nautical themes. In addition to his proficiency as an illustrator, Aylward was an award-winning artist and received a number of prestigious prizes such as the Salmagundi Club's Shaw Purchase Prize and the Philadelphia Color Club's Beck Prize for his work before the war.

During the war Aylward concentrated his efforts on recording the activities of the ports and transportation systems developed to support industrial warfare. Some of his best wartime work was done at the port of Marseilles after the armistice when he had the time to paint in some detail. Following the war, he exhibited at the Paris Salon in 1924 and the National Academy of Design in 1925.

He died February 26, 1956, and is buried in Bath National Cemetery, Bath, New York.

See also

 United States Army Art Program

References

External links

  

United States Army artists
1875 births
1956 deaths
American illustrators
20th-century American painters
American male painters
Artists from Milwaukee
Art Students League of New York alumni
United States Army personnel of World War I
United States Army officers
World War I artists
20th-century American male artists